The false stag beetles (Diphyllostoma) are a group of three species of rare beetles known only from California. Almost nothing is known of their life history beyond that the adults are diurnal and females are flightless; larvae have not been observed.

Their length ranges from 5 to 9 mm; bodies are elongate, with a generally dull brown to reddish-brown color. Both body and legs are covered with longish hairs.

Originally classed with the Lucanidae, Diphyllostoma have a number of characteristics not shared with any other type of stag beetle, and so in 1972 Holloway proposed a separate family Diphyllostomatidae, which has since been accepted.

Species 
 Diphyllostoma fimbriatum (Fall), 1901
 Diphyllostoma linsleyi Fall, 1932
 Diphyllostoma nigricolle Fall, 1912

Notes

References 
 Mary Liz Jameson and Brett C. Ratcliffe, "Diphyllostomatidae", in Ross H. Arnett, Jr. and Michael C. Thomas, American Beetles (CRC Press, 2001), vol. 2
 B. A. Holloway, "The systematic position of the genus Diphyllostoma Fall (Coleoptera: Scarabaeoidea)" New Zealand Journal of Science 15: 31-38 (1972)

External links 

Scarabaeiformia